Hormomitaria is a genus of fungi in the mushroom family Physalacriaceae.

References

Physalacriaceae